Kew railway station was the terminus of the Kew railway line, Australia. It was opened on 19 December 1887. The line ceased operations in August 1952, but the line and station were officially closed on 13 May 1957 and subsequently demolished. The headquarters of VicRoads now stands on the site.

Disused railway stations in Melbourne
Railway stations in Australia opened in 1887
Railway stations closed in 1952
1952 disestablishments in Australia